The 1878 Leith Burghs by-election was fought on 29 January 1878.  The byelection was fought due to the resignation of the incumbent Liberal MP, Donald Robert Macgregor.  It was won by the Liberal candidate Andrew Grant.

References

Leith Burghs by-election
1870s elections in Scotland
History of Leith
Leith Burghs by-election
By-elections to the Parliament of the United Kingdom in Edinburgh constituencies
1870s in Edinburgh
Leith Burghs by-election